Henry and Ribsy is the third book in the Henry Huggins series of humorous children's novels written by Beverly Cleary. Henry's dad has promised to take him salmon fishing on one condition – he has to keep his dog Ribsy out of trouble for two months. That's not easy to do, especially when Ramona Quimby gets involved. First published in 1954, Henry and Ribsy was originally illustrated by Louis Darling.

Henry wants to go on a salmon-fishing trip with his father. However, Ribsy has been causing a lot of trouble for the family. For example, after Henry got the job of taking out the garbage, whenever the garbage man comes, Ribsy tries to prevent the garbage man from taking away the trash because Ribsy thinks it belongs to Henry. Henry's father says that Henry can only come salmon fishing if he can keep Ribsy out of trouble for a month. Henry is able to do this, and Ribsy actually helps him catch an enormous 30 pounder salmon at the end of the day.

See also 
 

Novels by Beverly Cleary
1954 American novels
Novels set in Portland, Oregon
Children's novels about animals
1954 children's books